Norbert Zsivóczky (born 16 February 1988 in Budapest) is a Hungarian football player who currently plays for szigetszentmiklósi TK.

References 
HLSZ

1988 births
Living people
Footballers from Budapest
Hungarian footballers
Association football midfielders
Hungary youth international footballers
Ferencvárosi TC footballers
Stoke City F.C. players
Diósgyőri VTK players
Lombard-Pápa TFC footballers
Szigetszentmiklósi TK footballers
Nemzeti Bajnokság I players
Hungarian expatriate footballers
Expatriate footballers in England
Hungarian expatriate sportspeople in England